"Rich As Fuck" (edited for explicit album as "Rich As F**k" and for clean album as "Rich As F***") is a song by American hip hop recording artist Lil Wayne, sent to urban radio on April 9, 2013, as the third and final single from his tenth studio album, I Am Not a Human Being II (2013). The song, produced by T-Minus and Nikhil Seetharam, features a guest appearance from fellow rapper 2 Chainz. The song has since peaked at number 38 on the US Billboard Hot 100 and at number 11 on the Billboard Hot R&B/Hip-Hop Songs.

Background 
On January 6, 2013, the song "Rich As Fuck," featuring rapper 2 Chainz leaked unmastered and was originally set to be the second single from I Am Not a Human Being II, but "Love Me" was released as a single instead. On April 9, 2013, "Rich As Fuck" was released as the third and final single from the album. The official version of the song was remastered and the first and second verse were switched around, compared to the leaked version.

Critical reception 
"Rich As Fuck" was met with generally positive reviews from music critics. David Jefferies called the song "a winner with an enticing and eerie beat from T-Minus." Jody Rosen of Rolling Stone praised Lil Wayne's lyricism on the song and his "nimble musicality of his vocal tone and flow." Dean Van Nguyen of PopMatters said the "creeping funk beat on "Rich As Fuck" inspire Wayne to one of his sharpest flows on the album." Jon Hadusek of Consequence of Sound said the song had an old-school feel, and called the song I Am Not a Human Being's "finest moment." Jon Caramanica of The New York Times called 2 Chainz appearance on the song impressive. Brandon Soderberg of Spin also praised 2 Chainz for having a "charismatic presence on the song." Jayson Greene of Pitchfork Media said the Bay Area-influenced clap instrumental of the song work around him, not with him.

Complex ranked "Rich As Fuck" number 18 on their list of the 50 best songs of 2013, saying "The song might not push the limits of art, but when this comes on at the right time, it's the jam, and unlike a lot of the other big hits of the year, it didn't get played out."

Music video 
The music video was directed by Parris in early 2013, and was released on March 22, 2013 on MTV. The video was released on YouTube through his VEVO one day later, on March 23, 2013. The video is age-limited and need verification for viewing.

Chart performance

Weekly charts

Year-end charts

Certifications

Release history

References 

2013 singles
Lil Wayne songs
2 Chainz songs
Songs written by Lil Wayne
Songs written by 2 Chainz
Cash Money Records singles
Song recordings produced by T-Minus (record producer)
2012 songs
Songs written by Nikhil Seetharam
Songs written by T-Minus (record producer)
Trap music songs